Maryam is a 2002 film about a young woman who is an Iranian immigrant living in the United States at the time of the Iran hostage crisis. The film was written and directed by Ramin Serry. Mariam Parris plays the young woman. The film also features Shaun Toub as her father, Shohreh Aghdashloo as her mother, and David Ackert as her cousin, Ali, who becomes an Islamic fundamentalist.

Maryam was featured in the third Roger Ebert's Overlooked Film Festival in 2001.

The word "Maryam" is the Aramaic name of Mary, the mother of Jesus and means the same in Persian language. Maryam also means Tuberose in Persian and is a common first name in Iran.

External links
Review by Roger Ebert

2002 films
Films set in 1979
Films set in 1980
Films set in 1981
Films set in Iran
Films set in New Jersey
Iranian drama films
2002 drama films
2000s political films
American political drama films
Films about immigration to the United States
2000s American films